Martino Gamper (born in Merano, Italy, in 1971) is an Italian designer based in London who became internationally regarded through his project 100 Chairs in 100 Days. This group of works was exhibited in 2007 in London, the Milan Triennial in 2009, and at YBCA in San Francisco in late 2010. It has also been published by Dent-de-Leone as a book (100 Chairs in 100 Days and its 100 Ways) recently republished as a pocket book. The 100 Chairs project has been described by Gamper as "3D Drawing", and is typical of Gamper's practice in that it shows disregard for the historic design standards of harmony and symmetry. Gamper has stated "There is no perfect chair". 

Gamper is married to the sculptor Francis Upritchard.

Exhibitions 
Gamper has exhibited extensively both in the UK and internationally, including a chair arch of Ercol chairs for the London Design Festival at the V&A in September 2009, the British Council exhibition Get It Louder in Beijing, Shanghai and Guangzhou, Autoprogettazione Revisited: Easy-to-assemble Furniture at the Architectural Association, London, in October 2009 and Super Contemporary at the Design Museum, London, in October 2009. 
 2014: Martino Gamper/Design Is a State of Mind, Serpentine Gallery, London, later Museion, Bolzano.

Gamper is also a tutor at the Royal College of Art in London.

Publications
 "100 Chairs in 100 Days and its 100 Ways", published by Dent-De-Leone, designed by Åbäke, 
 "Piccolo Volume II", published by Nilufar & Dent-De-Leone, designed by Åbäke,

References

External links
Martino Gamper
Dent-de-Leone
Martino Gamper: design is a state of mind at the Serpentine Galleries

Living people
Italian furniture designers
People from Merano
1971 births
Germanophone Italian people